The following is a partial list of faults in Costa Rica:

Agua Caliente Fault, in the Central Valley.
Alajuela Fault, in the Central Valley.
Ángel-Varablanca Fault, in the Central Valley.
Atirro Fault, in Turrialba.
Buenavista Fault, in Pérez Zeledón.
Canoas Fault, in the Southern Zone.
Chiripa Fault, in the Northern Zone.
Escazú Fault, in the Central Valley.
Golfito Fault, in Golfito.
Guápiles Fault, in Caribbean Zone.
Jateo Fault, in the Central Valley.
Navarro Fault, in Turrialba.
San Miguel Fault, in the Central Valley.
Zarceró Fault, in the Northern Zone.

References 

 Faults
Geology of Costa Rica